Giuseppe Giacalone was an architect, active in the second half of the 16th century; mainly in his native city of Palermo, Sicily; and active in a Mannerist style. 

Born in the neighborhood of Capo in the quarter of Seralcadi to a family of builders (capomastri). he helped design the facades of the Porta Nuova in Palermo. He helped roof the nave of the church of Santa Maria la Nuova and complete the cloister of the Convent of Santa Cita. In 1586, the Dominican order in town gave him the commission to design and build the new church of Santa Cita, completed in 1622.

References 

Date of birth unknown
Date of death unknown
Architects from Palermo
16th-century Italian architects
Italian Mannerist architects